Scott Owens (born 1963) is an American poet, teacher, and editor living in Hickory, North Carolina.

History 
Owens was born in Greenwood, South Carolina, and raised in mill villages and on his grandparents' small farm.  His father was in the military, and the family later moved to Fort Bragg, NC, and then to Darmstadt, Germany, and Augusta, Georgia, where he graduated from the Academy of Richmond County.  Most of his early childhood was lived below the poverty line, necessitating frequent relocation in and around Greenwood.  His childhood was also marked by periods of domestic abuse by his stepfathers.  His mother was married 6 times during his childhood and his father 5 times.  Three of their marriages were to each other. In Hickory, Owens, with his wife, Julie, became owner of Taste Full Beans Coffeehouse, where he has hosted the monthly reading series, Poetry Hickory, since 2007.

Education

Owens was the first member of his family to attend college.  He earned a Bachelor of Arts degree in English with a minor in Education at Ohio University, where he studied with novelist, Daniel Keyes, and poet, Paul Nelson. He continued on to the University of North Carolina, Charlotte for a master's degree in English, studying with Robin Hemley, Robert Waters Grey, and Christopher Davis, and working on the journal, "Southern Poetry Review".  He also earned a Master of Fine Arts degree in Creative Writing from the University of North Carolina, Greensboro, studying under Fred Chappell and Stuart Dischell.

Poetry Community  and Editing Work

He is the founder of the reading series, Poetry Hickory (2007 - ), and the University Community Poetry Series (2016 - 2018), editor of "Wild Goose Poetry Review," and a writer of reviews of poetry collections and articles about writing. He has also been author of the poetry column, "Musings," published in Outlook, founding editor of 234, Associate Editor of Southern Poetry Review, Vice President of the Poetry Council of NC and the NC Poetry Society, and Founder of The Art of Poetry at the Hickory Museum of Art.  He has taught creativity, writing, and poetry workshops at various schools, conferences, and conventions throughout the Southeast, most recently at Lenoir Rhyne University.  He has also served as a judge for numerous poetry contests and been on the board of various reading series. Owens is recognized as a proponent of and community organizer for poetry.

Teaching

Owens has taught at the middle school, high school, and college levels, including a stint as Headmaster of The Patterson School.

Most of his creative and critical work has been completed while living in Hickory, North Carolina, and teaching at Lenoir Rhyne University and Catawba Valley Community College where, in 2013, he was recognized with the "Adjunct Excellence in Teaching Award."

Writing Awards

Owens's book, Sky Full of Stars and Dreaming was nominated for a National Book Critics' Circle Award. His poems have been nominated for eleven Pushcart Prizes and seven Best of the Net Awards, and received awards from the Academy of American Poets, the North Carolina Poetry Society, the Poetry Society of South Carolina, the Next Generation Indie Awards, and the North Carolina Writer's Network.  His poem, "So Norman Died of Course,"received a Special Mention from the Pushcart Prize Anthology for 2009 and "On the Days I Am Not My Father," "Cleaning House," "The Arrival of the Past," and "Rails" were featured on Garrison Keillor's The Writer's Almanac.  His more than 1400 published poems have appeared in a diverse range of journals, including Georgia Review, North American Review, Poetry East, Hayden’s Ferry Review, Cimarron Review, Greensboro Review, Chattahoochee Review, Cream City Review, Beloit Poetry Journal, and Cottonwood, among others.  More than 100 of his essays and reviews have appeared in Main Street Rag, The Pilot, Pirene's Fountain, and many others. He has spoken about poetry or shared his work on NPR, Tedx, several radio shows and podcasts, and at more than 200 public readings at universities, libraries, and conferences. His essays on poetry have appeared multiple times in Poets Market. 
 
Owens' papers are housed in the South Carolina Poetry Archives in the James B Duke Library at Furman University.

Themes 
Owens' poems treat a wide range of themes often expressed as dialectics, including faith and agnosticism, abuse and parenting, alienation and existentialism, loneliness and collaboration, entrapment and liberation, personal relationships and self-sufficiency, nightmares and reality, the disappearance of a rural American South characterized as both pastoral and violent, and the possibilities of redemption as his characters attempt to make sense of an often seemingly senseless world.  His settings and imagery are familiar but often quirky, utilizing extended metaphors and juxtaposing the mundane with the transcendent in sometimes disturbing ways. His work is marked by diversity in tone, style and subject matter, at times nearly formal, at other times conversational and performance-based; at times political, at other times focused on nature; at times distraught about the state of humanity, but just as often optimistic and celebratory. He often re-envisions the lives of familiar historical and mythological characters and has created his own everyman figure named Norman.  He cites deep imagism, confessionalism, and surrealism among his strongest influences. and lists Whitman, Frost, Stevens, Williams, Cummings, Plath, Sexton, Yannis Ritsos, Yehuda Amichai, CP Cavafy, George Seferis, Adrienne Rich, Galway Kinnell, and Tim Peeler as the poets who have had the greatest impact on his own work and thought. All of those influences can be seen in his book Counting the Ways where he utilizes Stevens' Objectivism and Eliot's Objective Correlative in a search for meaningful narratives by tracing the recurrence of particular images or motifs across personal, social, religious, historical, and literary contexts. His newest book, Sky Full of Stars and Dreaming consists of poems written mostly during the Covid-19 pandemic and which find hope and meaning in nature, love, family, work, and perspective. Like much of Owens' work the poems vary in form and voice, ranging from haiku to sonnets and prose poems.

Works 
All In (Redhawk, 2023)
Prepositional: Selected and New Poems (Redhawk, 2022)
Worlds Enough: Poems for Children (and a few grown ups) (Redhawk, 2022)
Sky Full of Stars and Dreaming (Redhawk, 2021)
Counting the Ways (Main Street Rag, 2020)
Down to Sleep (Main Street Rag, 2016)
Thinking About the Next Big Bang in the Galaxy at the Edge of Town (Main Street Rag, 2015)
To (Main Street Rag, 2014)
Eye of the Beholder (Main Street Rag, 2013)
Shadows Trail Them Home (Clemson University Press, 2012)
For One Who Knows How to Own Land (Future Cycle Press, 2012)
Country Roads: Travels Through Rural North Carolina, Collaboration with Photographer Clayton Joe Young (2012)
Something Knows the Moment (Main Street Rag, 2011)
The Nature of Attraction, collaboration with Pris Campbell (Main Street Rag, 2010)
Paternity (Main Street Rag, 2010)
The Fractured World (Main Street Rag, 2008)
Book of Days (Dead Mule, 2009)
Deceptively Like a Sound (Dead Mule, 2008)
The Persistence of Faith (Sandstone, 1994)

External links 
Architecture of loss and loneliness
Wild Goose Poetry Review
The Pedestal Magazine 
The Fractured World by Scott Owens (poems)
Joe Milford Hosts Scott Owens!
Scott Owens Collection - Furman University Special Collections
Scott Owens' Website
Scott Owens' Blog "Musings"
Writer's Digest Interview with Poet Scott Owens, October 10, 2011

References 

American male poets
Living people
1963 births
People from Greenwood, South Carolina
People from Hickory, North Carolina
Academy of Richmond County alumni
21st-century American poets
21st-century American male writers